Senator Fellenz may refer to:

L. J. Fellenz (1882–1941), Wisconsin State Senate
Louis J. Fellenz Jr. (1915–1993), Wisconsin State Senate